Moler (previously called Snuff) are a power pop band which formed in 1993 as a three-piece with founding mainstays Helen Cattanach on bass guitar and lead vocals and Julien Poulsen on lead guitar. They featured a changing line-up of drummers and sometimes worked as a four-piece with a keyboardist. Their sole studio album, Golden Duck, was released in October 1997 via Infectious with Lindsay Gravina producing. They disbanded in 2001. 

They were nominated for the ARIA Award for Best Rock Album and opened the Mushroom Concert of the Century. According to McFarlane, "[they] built-up a buzz around the Melbourne independent scene with its mix of noisy guitar fuzz, hard-driving beats, strident pop melodies and Cattanach's alternately sweet'n'purring and aggressive vocals."

According to Australian musicologist, Ian McFarlane, "[they] built-up a buzz around the Melbourne independent scene with its mix of noisy guitar fuzz, hard-driving beats, strident pop melodies and Cattanach's alternately sweet'n'purring and aggressive vocals."

History

1993-1995: Snuff
Moler were started as Snuff in Melbourne in 1993 as an indie guitar pop trio by Helen Cattanach on bass guitar and lead vocals, David Peacock on drums and Julien Poulson on lead guitar. Cattanach (ex-T-Bones) and Poulson (ex-Snappers) had been members of the Stiff Kittens, which gigged in Melbourne before relocating to Hong Kong where the pair formed Kick House. They reformed the Stiff Kittens in London in 1992 with Rob Lastdrager on drums and vocals (ex-Snappers, T-Bones) and Richard Webb on lead vocals and guitar (ex-Strange Fruit, T-Bones). That group issued an extended play, As You Walk, via London-based label, Psychic Records. The members returned to Australia.

In 1995, Snuff released a five-track EP, Driven, via Fat Buddha Records with Lindsay Gravina producing.

1995-2001: Moler
Late in 1995, Snuff changed their name to Moler and signed with Infectious Records. Moler featured a changing line-up of drummers. 

Snuff's debut EP, On Special, was released in June 1996, of its five tracks Australian musicologist, Ian McFarlane, found "The lead-off track, 'Shopping Trolley', displayed plenty of appeal." A second five-track EP, Coaster, followed in September.

The group toured with fellow local bands, Snout and Magic Dirt, and supported gigs by international artists, Weezer, Everclear, Ash and Garageland. Early in 1997 Peacock was replaced on drums by Steve Boyle. Moler released their third EP, Infatuation, with four tracks in May 1997. Its title track was placed on high rotation by national youth radio station, Triple J.

They released their debut album, Golden Duck in October 1997 via Infectious/Mushroom/Sony Records with Gravina producing. Boyle was replaced by Neil Lynch on drums and they added Matt Heydon (ex-Nick Barker and the Reptiles) on keyboards. 

They found a new drummer in early 2000, with Mike Glenn (ex-Hoss) joining, in time for a tour of the United States in March.

In 2001, The group released, Red & White Stripes before disbanding.

2018-present: Reformation
In 2018 the group reformed for a one off show on Friday November 23 at The Curtin Hotel in Carlton, Melbourne to celebrate the 25th anniversary of their formation. The released a digital EP, titled Work in October 2019.

Discography

Albums

Extended plays

Awards and nominations

ARIA Music Awards
The ARIA Music Awards are a set of annual ceremonies presented by Australian Recording Industry Association (ARIA), which recognise excellence, innovation, and achievement across all genres of the music of Australia. They commenced in 1987.

! 
|-
| 1998 || Golden Duck || ARIA Award for Best Rock Album||  || 
|-

References

Musical groups established in 1993
Musical groups disestablished in 2001
Victoria (Australia) musical groups